Thirumalai Ananthanpillai Sekar ((born 28 March 1956, in Madras) was a fast bowler who represented India in Test cricket and One Day Internationals.

Sekar was one of the fastest bowlers in India in the early eighties. His two Test matches were in the 1982-83 season when he was flown out to Pakistan to replace the injured Madan Lal. He did not take a wicket in either match. He played a One Day International in that series and three more against England two years later.

Sekar played for Tamil Nadu between 1976/77 and 1987/88 taking 74 wickets. His career best effort was 9 for 54 against Kerala in 1981/82. He played for Madhya Pradesh for two seasons before bowing out of the game.

Since then his major contribution to Indian cricket was as a bowling coach at the MRF Pace Foundation in Chennai where he was chief coach for several years, working with leading pace bowlers from across the world. He also served as South Zone representative on the National Selection Committee for a period of time. He was later appointed as a talent scout for Mumbai Indians.

References

External links
 

Indian cricketers
India Test cricketers
India One Day International cricketers
Living people
Tamil Nadu cricketers
South Zone cricketers
Madhya Pradesh cricketers
Central Zone cricketers
Tamil sportspeople
1956 births
Cricketers from Chennai
India national cricket team selectors
Indian cricket coaches